Rott is a municipality  in the district of Landsberg in Bavaria in Germany.

References

Landsberg (district)